Sandra Camila Antonia Fuentes-Berain Villenave (born 13 June 1950 Mexico City ) is a Mexican diplomat and Ambassador Emeritus of the Mexican Foreign Service .

Life 
She graduated from the National Autonomous University of Mexico (UNAM).

She worked for  the Foreign Service of Mexico. She began as Consul General of Mexico in Hong Kong and Milan.  She was Ambassador of Mexico to Canada from 1993 to 1998, France from 1998 to 2001, and the Netherlands from 2004 to 2007. She was Head of Mission of Mexico to the European Union, and Ambassador to Belgium and Luxembourg from 2007 to 2013.

In the Netherlands she managed to get Mexico into the International Criminal Court and chaired the Hague Working Group, while in Brussels she obtained the recognition of Mexico as a strategic partner of the European Union. Her last position was Consul General of Mexico in New York City, from 2013 to 2016.

References

External links 

 Embajadora Sandra Fuentes-Berain sobre su carrera diplomátic Americas Society/Council of the Americas Dec 3, 2015

1950 births
Living people
National Autonomous University of Mexico alumni
Consuls-General in New York
Consuls in Hong Kong
Ambassadors of Mexico to Luxembourg
Ambassadors of Mexico to Belgium
Ambassadors of Mexico to the European Union
Ambassadors of Mexico to the Netherlands
Ambassadors of Mexico to France
Ambassadors of Mexico to Canada